Voicings was the last recording by the Minneapolis jazz vocal group  Rio Nido. The album was one of the early recordings to feature live "direct to digital" recording techniques.

Track listing
 "Northern Lights" (D. Karr, L. Ball)
 "I'm So Lonesome I Could Cry" (Hank Williams)
 "In a Mellow Tone" (Duke Ellington)
 "Lost and Found" (T. Sparks, M. Jackson)
 "Since I Fell For You" (B. Johnson)
 "You and I" (Stevie Wonder)
 "Auld Lang Syne" (Trad.)
 "Flying Home" (L. Hampton)

Personnel
Prudence Johnson - vocals
Tim Sparks - vocals, guitar
Roger Hernandez - vocals
Tom Lewis - bass
Dave Birget - guest vocalist, bass
Jimmy Hamilton - piano
Bill Carrothers - piano
Phil Hey - drums
Marc Anderson - percussion
Gary "Ice Man" Berg - tenor sax, chromatic harmonica
Dave Karr - tenor sax
Kathy Jensen - tenor sax, flute
Dave Jensen - trumpet, flugelhorn
Pete Emblom - trombone, arranger

Production notes
Produced by Rio Nido

References

Rio Nido albums
1986 albums